Kim Gamble (13 July 1952 – 19 February 2016) was an Australian illustrator of children's books. He is best known for the Tashi books, which have been translated into more than 20 languages and adapted for television.

Early life
Kim Hunter Gamble was born in Sydney on 13 July 1952. Whilst initially working as a teacher and in other jobs, he eventually became a children's illustrator later in life.

Career
Gamble trained as a teacher and worked in a variety of occupations.

Gamble was a self-taught artist. Beginning to illustrate stories for children at the age of 24, his first assignment in 1976 was for The Land Behind the World by Anne Spencer Parry and three sequels. In 1989, he illustrated for the School Magazine, and he continued illustrating for the magazine for many years. Gamble met author Anna Fienberg, with whom he produced more than 20 books, at the School Magazine where she was the editor.

He illustrated The Magnificent Nose and Other Marvels by Anna Fienberg, published in 1991. His collaborations with Fienberg included award winning The Magnificent Nose and Other Marvels, the Tashi series and Tashi picture books, the Minton series and Joseph. Joseph was shortlisted for the 2002 CBCA Picture Book of the Year Award.  The Tashi series of books were translated into more than 20 languages and adapted for television.

He worked with many authors and illustrated over seventy books in his career. Some of Gamble's artwork for The Hottest Boy Who Ever Lived by Anna Fienberg is held in the National Centre for Australian Children's Literature (formerly the Lu Rees Archives).

Works
 Parry, Anne Spencer, 1931–1985; Gamble Kim, 1952–2016, (illustrator.) (1976), The Land Behind the World, Pinchgut Press, 
 Parry, Anne Spencer, 1931–1985; Gamble Kim, 1952–2016, (illustrator.) (1977), The Lost Souls of the Twilight, Pinchgut Press, 
 Parry, Anne Spencer, 1931–1985; Gamble Kim, 1952–2016, (illustrator.) (1979), The Crown of Darkness, Pinchgut Press, 
 Parry, Anne Spencer, 1931–1985; Gamble Kim, 1952–2016, (illustrator.) (1980), The Crown of Light, Pinchgut Press, 
  (the Children's Book of the Year Award: Younger Readers in 1992)

Tashi books

Minton books

Awards
 1992 Crichton Award for Children's Book Illustration for

Personal life
Gamble had two daughters, Greer and Arielle.  He died on 19 February 2016 at the age of 63.

References

Australian children's book illustrators
1952 births
2016 deaths